is a former Japanese football player.

Club career
Hiramoto was born in Hachioji on 18 August 1981. He joined the Verdy Kawasaki (later Tokyo Verdy) youth team in 1999. He became a regular player in 2002. However he lost an opportunity to play in 2007. In May 2007, he moved to Yokohama FC. He returned to Tokyo Verdy in 2008 and he played many matches. His opportunity to play decreased in 2011. He moved to FC Machida Zelvia in 2012 and Ventforet Kofu in 2013. He returned to Tokyo Verdy in 2014. Although he played many matches, he lost an opportunity to play in 2017 and retired at the end of the 2017 season.

National team career
In June 2001, Hiramoto was selected Japan U-20 national team for 2001 World Youth Championship. At this tournament, he played 1 match.

Club statistics

References

External links

1981 births
Living people
Association football people from Tokyo
Japanese footballers
Japan youth international footballers
J1 League players
J2 League players
Tokyo Verdy players
Yokohama FC players
FC Machida Zelvia players
Ventforet Kofu players
Association football forwards